John Thomas Lesley (May 12, 1835 – July 13, 1913) was a cattleman and pioneer in Tampa, Florida. He fought in the Third Seminole War and was a captain in the Confederate Army during the Civil War. Lesley formed his own volunteer company the "Sunny South Guards", and commanded the "Cow Cavalry", until he was wounded and replaced by W. B. Henderson. After the war he became a state senator.

Prior to the Civil War he owned a few slaves.

Major William Iredell Turner (1812-1881) and Lesley (then a major) helped Confederate Secretary of State Judah P. Benjamin escape following the collapse of the Confederacy and hid Benjamin in a swamp behind Major Turner's House. He remained there for several days until they were sure the area was cleared of Federal soldiers. Benjamin was then transported to Gamble Mansion. Lesley was one of the original owners of the Tampa Street Railway.

His marriage to William T. Brown's daughter Margaret created what would become a powerful dynasty in business, politics and agriculture. Lesley's son William T. Lesley was Sheriff and a member of the Florida Constitutional Convention of 1885. Theodore Lesley, John T. Lesley's other son, was a county historian and  preservationist.

Lesley is buried in downtown Tampa's Oaklawn Cemetery.

References

American people of Scottish descent
Florida pioneers
Florida state senators
Mayors of Tampa, Florida
19th-century American people
1835 births
1913 deaths
People of Florida in the American Civil War
Confederate States Army personnel
American cattlemen
American slave owners